Rolf Greger Strøm (17 May 1940 – 4 August 1994) was a Norwegian luger. He participated at the 1964 Winter Olympics in Innsbruck, where he placed fourth in the men's singles, and competed at the 1968 Winter Olympics.

References

1940 births
1994 deaths
Sportspeople from Oslo
Norwegian male lugers
Olympic lugers of Norway
Lugers at the 1964 Winter Olympics
Lugers at the 1968 Winter Olympics